Elan Vital may refer to:

 Élan vital, a philosophical term coined by Henri Bergson in 1907, roughly translated as "vital impetus" or "vital force"
 Elan Vital (organization), a nonprofit group formed in the United States, active from 1971 to 2010
 Élan Vital (album), a 2006 album by the music group Pretty Girls Make Graves
 Elan Vital, a partially sentient machine from the anime series Melody of Oblivion

See also 
 Elan (disambiguation)
 Vital (disambiguation)